"Let's Live a Little" is a country music song written by Ruth E. Coletharp, recorded by Carl Smith, and released on the Columbia label. In June 1951, it reached No. 2 on the country charts. It spent 20 weeks on the charts and was the No. 9 country record of 1951 based on juke box plays.

The song has been covered by artists, including Jerry Lee Lewis, Tommy Collins, Jimmy Wakely, and Tex Williams.

See also
 List of Billboard Top Country & Western Records of 1951

References

1951 songs
Carl Smith (musician) songs